Heather Robyn Tarr (born October 5, 1974) is an American, former collegiate softball third baseman, and is the current head coach at Washington. Tarr become one of five coaches/athletes to have played and coached in the Women's College World Series, playing in the 1996 Women's College World Series as well the 1997 Women's College World Series, and coaching the Huskies at the 2009 Women's College World Series. She was the first coach to win a title with her alma mater when the Huskies won the national championship in 2009. Tarr has also assisted Team USA and helped coach the team at the 2020 Summer Olympics.

Early life and education
Born in Kirkland, Washington, Tarr graduated from Redmond High School and played at infielder on the Washington Huskies softball team from 1994 to 1997 while attending the University of Washington. Playing a total of 244 games at Washington, Tarr was an honorable mention all-Pac-10 honoree from 1995 to 1997 and second-team NFCA All-Pacific Region honoree in 1997. As a senior in 1997, Tarr batted .283 with 53 hits and 32 RBI.

Professional softball career
Tarr played professionally with the Tampa Bay FireStix of the Women's Professional Softball League in 1997 and 1998, playing 64 games with 26 hits and 10 RBI.

Coaching career

College assistant (1998–2004)
In 1998, Tarr was an undergraduate assistant at Washington while completing her geography degree.

From 1999 to 2004, Tarr was an assistant coach at Pacific under head coach Brian Kolze and was associate head coach during the 2004 season. With Tarr on staff, Pacific went 232–124 and 90–44 mark in the Big West Conference. In 2001, Tarr and Pacific head coach Brian Kolze was named 2001 NFCA West Region Coaching Staff of the Year after guiding the Tigers to within one win of the Women's College World Series and finished the year at No. 18 in the final national ranking.

Washington (2005–present)
After the 2004 season at Pacific as an assistant, Heather Tarr was named head coach of the Washington Huskies softball team. In her first season Heather Tarr led the Huskies to a 35–22 overall record and led them to the NCAA Super Regionals where they lost to eventual national champion Michigan. In 2009, Tarr led Washington 51–12 overall record and won the 2009 Women's College World Series, Washington's first title in program history. She became the first coach to win a title with her alma mater.

 She led the Huskies to a runner-up finish in the 2018 Women's College World Series. Tarr has been a mentor to athletes Danielle Lawrie, Ali Aguilar and Taran Alvelo.

As of the end of the 2021 season, Tarr has an overall 704–260–1 record at Washington.

Team USA
Tarr was named as an assistant coach for the United States women's softball team in 2019. On October 25, 2021, Tarr became the head coach for Team USA.

Statistics

Head coaching record
Sources:

References

External links
 

1974 births
Living people
Female sports coaches
American softball coaches
Washington Huskies softball coaches
Washington Huskies softball players
Pacific Tigers softball coaches
Sportspeople from Kirkland, Washington
Sportspeople from Redmond, Washington
Softball players from Washington (state)
United States women's national softball team coaches